Ingeborg Gjærum (born 16 April 1985) is a Norwegian environmentalist.

She hails from Ottestad. She broke national news in 2005, when she was a central board member of Natur og Ungdom. She was deputy leader from 2006 to 2008, and became leader in 2008. She remained so until 2009.

In 2010 she was hired by the public relations firm Burson-Marsteller.

References

1985 births
Living people
Norwegian environmentalists
Norwegian women environmentalists
Nature and Youth activists